Brown County is a county located in the U.S. state of Illinois. As of the 2010 census, the population was 6,937. Its county seat is Mount Sterling.

Siloam Springs State Park is located partly in this county.

History
Brown County was formed out of Schuyler County in 1839. It is named in honor of U.S. General Jacob Brown, who defeated the British at the Battle of Sackett's Harbor in 1813.

Geography
The Illinois River flows along part of the county's eastern border.

Adjacent counties
 Schuyler County - north
 Cass County - east
 Morgan County - southeast
 Pike County - south
 Adams County - west

Major highways
  US Route 24
  Illinois Route 99
  Illinois Route 107

Climate and weather

Demographics

As of the 2010 United States Census, there were 6,937 people, 2,099 households, and 1,346 families living in the county. The racial makeup of the county was 76.1% white, 18.5% black or African American, 0.2% Asian, 0.2% American Indian, 4.4% from other races, and 0.6% from two or more races. Those of Hispanic or Latino origin made up 5.8% of the population. In terms of ancestry, 25.5% were German, 15.6% were American, 12.7% were Irish, and 6.1% were English.

Of the 2,099 households, 28.4% had children under the age of 18 living with them, 51.3% were married couples living together, 8.6% had a female householder with no husband present, 35.9% were non-families, and 32.2% of all households were made up of individuals. The average household size was 2.30 and the average family size was 2.88. The median age was 37.3 years.

The median income for a household in the county was $38,696 and the median income for a family was $50,341. Males had a median income of $34,648 versus $27,288 for females. The per capita income for the county was $17,133. About 9.9% of families and 12.0% of the population were below the poverty line, including 15.0% of those under age 18 and 9.2% of those age 65 or over.

The Illinois state prison, Western Illinois Correctional Center, located south east of Mount Sterling, has an average daily population of 2,066. The all-male population and racial makeup of the prison is so large, compared to the rest of the county, that it skews the census demographic data. This is evidenced by the lopsided age pyramid.

Communities

City
 Mount Sterling (seat)

Villages
 Mound Station
 Ripley
 Versailles

Townships
Brown County is divided into these nine townships:

 Buckhorn
 Cooperstown
 Elkhorn
 Lee
 Missouri
 Mount Sterling
 Pea Ridge
 Ripley
 Versailles

Unincorporated Communities

 Benville
 Buckhorn
 Cooperstown
 Damon
 Fargo
 Gilbirds
 Hersman
 Jaques
 La Grange
 Morrelville
 Siloam

Politics
Brown County is located in Illinois's 15th Congressional District and is currently represented by Republican Mary Miller. For the Illinois House of Representatives, the county is located in the 93rd district and is currently represented by Republican Norine Hammond. The county is located in the 47th district of the Illinois Senate, and is currently represented by Republican Jil Tracy.

Brown County is part of the German-settled area of western Central Illinois and the Missouri Rhineland centred on the St. Louis metropolitan area. This region was opposed both to southern plantation owners and socially liberal Yankees and consequently voted against the majority of people in their state. Brown County voted for the Democratic candidate in every presidential election from at least 1840 through 1948, with the sole exception of the 1928 election when the county voted for the Republican candidate Herbert Hoover. From 1952 to 2020, Democrats have carried Brown County only three times (1964, 1976, and 1992) and have won a majority of the vote only once (1964).

Education
 Brown County Community Unit School District 1
 Meredosia-Chambersburg Community Unit School District 11
 Southeastern Community Unit School District 337

See also
 National Register of Historic Places listings in Brown County, Illinois

References
Specific

General
 United States Census Bureau 2007 TIGER/Line Shapefiles
 United States Board on Geographic Names (GNIS)
 United States National Atlas

External links
 

 
Illinois counties
1839 establishments in Illinois
Populated places established in 1839